The Council of American Ambassadors (CAA) is an association of non-career United States ambassadors. A nonprofit and nonpartisan organization, the CAA comprises over 200 members whose ambassadorial service collectively extends over five decades and eleven U.S. presidents.

CAA supports the Department of State and its Chiefs of Mission, sponsors Fellowships to develop young leaders for careers in public diplomacy and international affairs, and conducts semiannual conferences on current international topics.

The Council convenes roundtable member discussions with Ambassadors to the United States, organizes overseas fact-finding missions, publishes a bi-annual journal, The Ambassadors REVIEW, administers Ambassadors Perspectives, an on-line forum for commentary, and educates the public about foreign policy issues affecting the national interest.

Programs

The Council fulfills its mission through its programs, which serve to educate the public about critical foreign policy issues affecting the national interest.  Council programs include: 
 Conferences and forums, held in Washington, DC, and cities around the country, to enhance the public's understanding of international issues.
 Ambassadors Roundtables, which allow members to engage in off-the-record, meaningful dialogues with foreign Chiefs of Mission currently accredited to the White House.
 Overseas Fact-finding Missions to enhance international relations and investigate the opportunities and challenges beyond our borders that generally cannot be gained through normal media channels.
 The Council collaborates with the U.S. Department of State to support the role of the American ambassador and the country team in carrying out U.S. foreign policy at embassies around the world. 
 Programs such as the Ambassadorial Orientation program, which enables newly appointed ambassadors to hear from and share experiences with those who have preceded them in the field, develop and strengthen this partnership.
Leadership Development

The Council supports fellowships that foster and develop young leaders in international affairs and public diplomacy.

The International Affairs Fellowship is a prestigious summer program that provides practical training through internships at the Department of State and academic studies in   international affairs.

The Public Diplomacy Fellowship combines on-the-job training with academic study and mentoring by former U.S. ambassadors, public diplomacy/public affairs officers and media/communications executives.  Its purpose is to enhance the conduct and practice of U.S. public diplomacy through the provision of specialized training and mentoring opportunities.

References

External links 

 Official website

Non-profit organizations based in Washington, D.C.